Hans Ek (born 1964 in Uppsala, Sweden), is a conductor and arranger working in the meeting between classical music, jazz, pop and folk music.

He has worked with symphony orchestras in Sweden, as well as in Norway, Denmark, Britain, Canada, Lithuania and Turkey.

Ek has in recent years been musical director of the Polar Music Prize ceremony.

In recent years he has also devoted his time to film music.

Since 2013 he is on tour with Dan Berglund and Magnus Öström of the Esbjörn Svensson Trio, performing their songs with orchestral arrangements.

Sources

External links
 Hans Ek – official website

1964 births
Swedish conductors (music)
Male conductors (music)
Swedish composers
Swedish male composers
Living people
21st-century conductors (music)
21st-century Swedish male musicians
Esbjörn Svensson Trio members